The 2019 British Figure Skating Championships were held in Sheffield from 26 November to 1 December 2018. BBC Sport covered events on Friday 30 November and Saturday 1 December. Medals were awarded in the disciplines of men's singles, ladies' singles, pair skating, and ice dancing on the senior, junior, and novice levels. The results were among the criteria used to determine international assignments.

Senior results

Men
Graham Newberry won his second national title.

Ladies
Defending ladies' champion Natasha McKay won her third title.

Pairs

Ice dance
Lilah Fear / Lewis Gibson were second after a fall in the rhythm dance but overtook Robynne Tweedale / Joseph Buckland in the next segment.

International team selections

European Championships
Following the conclusion of the British Championships, the team for the 2019 European Championships was published.

References

External links
 2019 British Championships results

British Figure Skating Championships, 2018
British Figure Skating Championships
Figure Skating Championships